Il re (The king) is a novella or opera in one act and three scenes by composer Umberto Giordano to an Italian libretto by Giovacchino Forzano. The opera premiered at La Scala in Milan on 12 January 1929.

The opera is a short comedy, only lasting about 1 hour in performance, about a young woman, Rosalina, betrothed to Colombello. One day she sees the King in all his majesty and falls in love with him, breaking the engagement with Colombello. But after meeting the king privately in his chamber, and seeing him with no crown or clothes, she loses her interest in him and returns to Colombello.

Performance history
Unusual for a 20th-century opera, Il re was written specifically as a vehicle for Toti Dal Monte, a coloratura soprano of the old school. Dal Monte performed the work a number of times during her career but after her retirement, the opera quickly fell into obscurity.  In December 1949, Arturo Toscanini, who had conducted the world premiere of the opera, featured the short "Dance of the Moor" on a broadcast concert with the NBC Symphony Orchestra.

Roles 

 * Dal Monte alternated performances of the role of Rosalina with Mercedes Capsir during the original 1929 production.

Recordings
Umberto Giordano: Il re and Mese mariano - Orchestra Internazionale d'Italia and Coro del Teatro Petruzzelli, conducted by Renato Palumbo. Recorded live at the Festival della Valle d'Itria with Patrizia Ciofi as Carmela in Mese mariano. Label: Dynamic CDS-231.

External links 
 Libretto of Il Re on operalibretto.com

References
Notes

Sources
Levine, Robert, Review of Il re and Mese mariano (Dynamic CDS-231) , Classics Today. Accessed 16 March 2009.
Manuscript is in Museo Teatrale alla Scala, Milano 

Operas
1929 operas
Operas by Umberto Giordano
Italian-language operas
One-act operas
Opera world premieres at La Scala